Lachenalia longituba is a species of flowering plant in the genus Lachenalia, native to the Roggeveld plateau of South Africa. It has gained the Royal Horticultural Society's Award of Garden Merit.

References

longituba
Endemic flora of South Africa
Plants described in 2003